The Gsung-'bum (Tibetan: "collected works") are the collected Buddhist writings of a lama, specifically one from Mongolia or Tibet, as distinguished from the Bka'-'gyur and Bstan-'gyur.

References

External links
Gsung-'bum article from Encyclopædia Britannica

Tibetan Buddhist treatises